The 2004 Amsterdam Admirals season was the tenth season for the franchise in the NFL Europe League (NFLEL). The team was led by head coach Bart Andrus in his fourth year, and played its home games at Amsterdam ArenA in Amsterdam, Netherlands. They finished the regular season in third place with a record of five wins and five losses.

Offseason

Free agent draft

Personnel

Staff

Roster

Schedule

Standings

Game summaries

Week 1: at Frankfurt Galaxy

Week 2: vs Berlin Thunder

Week 3: at Scottish Claymores

Week 4: vs Frankfurt Galaxy

Week 5: at Berlin Thunder

Week 6: at Rhein Fire

Week 7: vs Cologne Centurions

Week 8: vs Scottish Claymores

Week 9: at Cologne Centurions

Week 10: vs Rhein Fire

Notes

References

Amsterdam
Amsterdam Admirals seasons